Phellodon fibulatus is a species of tooth fungus in the family Bankeraceae. Found in the United States, the fungus was described as new to science in 1972 by Canadian mycologist Kenneth A. Harrison. It is one of the few species of Phellodon that possess clamp connections in its hyphae.

References

External links

Fungi described in 1972
Fungi of the United States
Inedible fungi
fibulatus
Fungi without expected TNC conservation status